The Baylor Bears began sending draftees to the NFL in 1939. The most selections in a single year is six, set in the 2022 NFL Draft.

Key

Selections

References 

Baylor

Baylor Bears NFL draft